Yuru may refer to:

Yuru people
Yuru language

Places
Abu Yuru, Iran
Yuru Monastery
Yuru Camp

People
Li Yuru, singer
Lin Yuru, writer
Ye Yuru, Mandarin name of Nancy Ip